The African Stars Football Club are a professional Namibian football club from Windhoek. They play in the country's highest division, the Namibia Premier League.

Achievements
Namibia Premier League:
Champions:(5) 1994, 2008–09, 2009–10, 2014–15, 2017-18

Namibian Cup:
Champions:(5) 2007, 2010, 2013, 2014, 2018

Standard Bank Cup
Champions:(1)  2015
Runners-up:(1) 2014

Dr Hage Geingob Cup
Runners-up: 2014, 2015
Third place:2016

Performance in CAF competitions
CAF Champions League: 2 appearances
2019 – First Roun
2020 – Preliminary Round

CAF Confederation Cup: 1 appearance
2014 - 

CAF Cup: 1 appearance
1992 – First Round

References

External links
 Team profile – soccerway.com

1962 establishments in South West Africa
Association football clubs established in 1962
Football clubs in Namibia
Namibia Premier League clubs
Sport in Windhoek